Pakistani spices The following is a partial list of spices commonly used in Pakistani cuisine:

Other herbs with their Urdu names:

External links
 
 
 
 

Spices